Faisal bin Sultan al-Duwaish (Arabic: فيصل بن سلطان .الدويش المطيري c. 1882 – 1931) was Prince of the Mutair tribe and one of Arabia's Ikhwan leaders, who assisted Abdulaziz in the unification of Saudi Arabia. The mother of Faisal bin Sultan was from the Ajman tribe and the sister of Dhaydan bin Hithlain, another Ikhwan leader and sheikh of the Ajman tribe.

Ikhwan 
Although he joined Ikhwan in 1912 when it was established, his embracement of the Wahhabi approach took place in 1918. Al Duwaish commanded the attack on Kuwait forces in Hamdh on 16 May 1920. Later, in 1920, he led an attack by the Ikhwan on Kuwait.

Faisal bin Sultan also participated in the capture of Hejaz in 1924–1925, and although he wanted to be the ruler of Madina, the Saudis asked him to leave the region. This incident was one of the reasons for the Ikhwan revolt against Abdulaziz in the next years.

Faisal bin Sultan and other leading Ikhwan leaders did not participate in the meeting held by Abdulaziz in Riyadh in 1928 to settle the conflicts. However, just before the start of the battle against Saudi forces, Faisal bin Sultan met with the Saudis, but it was not a fruitful attempt. He was injured at the 1929 battle of Sabilla, fled Arabia and later surrendered to the British in Kuwait. Sultan was pardoned by his former ruler Abdulaziz upon the request of his sister, Walha. However, he was later jailed in Riyadh where he died in 1931 suffering from an aneurysm.

Pictures

References

External links
 KUNA
 

20th-century Saudi Arabian people
1882 births
1931 deaths
Ikhwan
Saudi Arabian military personnel
Saudi Arabian dissidents